Jimmy Lee Banks (May 14, 1956 – July 27, 1982) was an American professional wrestler, best known by his ring name Kasavubu, who competed in Stampede Wrestling and well known in the World Wide Wrestling Federation as Jojo Andrews. One of the top "heels" in Stampede in the late-1970s, his career was short lived, as he suddenly died of a heart attack.

Career
Banks started wrestling in 1975 at the age of 19 for Big Time Wrestling in Detroit. He was trained by Canadian wrestler Johnny Powers.

World Wide Wrestling Federation
In 1976, Banks made his WWWF debut under the name Jojo Andrews. During his first stint, he wrestled Andre the Giant, Ivan Putski, Dominic DeNucci, Bobo Brazil, and Bob Backlund. In 1977, he would leave the WWWF to fight in the independents and Stampede Wrestling in Calgary.

In 1979, he returned to the WWWF, this time the name was changed to WWF World Wrestling Federation. He lost to Larry Zbyszko, Tito Santana, Pat Patterson and Tony Atlas. In 1980 he left the company.

Stampede Wrestling
Banks wrestled in Stu Hart's Stampede Wrestling in Calgary, Alberta, Canada, where he became well known in his career as Kasavubu billed from Uganda. He was managed by J.R. Foley. At first he wrestled under the name Tiger Jackson, until changing his name to Kasavubu. He feuded with Leo Burke, John Quinn, Hubert Gallant, and Keith Hart. The peak of his career was when he defeated Paddy Ryan for Stampede North American Heavyweight Championship on September 22, 1978. He dropped the title to Alo Leilani on November 12. After the title loss, Kasavubu returned to the WWF.

In 1980, after a nearly two-year hiatus, he returned after leaving the World Wrestling Federation. He teamed up with the Dynamite Kid winning the Stampede Wrestling International Tag Team Championship by defeating the Hart Family on June 3. Three weeks later they dropped the titles backed to the Harts. Later that year he teamed up with Mr. Sakurada and defeated the Harts for the tag teams titles before dropping them to Jim Neidhart and Hercules Ayala. He went on to feud with Hercules Ayala and Bret Hart.

Death
Banks was forced to leave Stampede Wrestling due to diabetes-related health problems. At one point, Banks had been using a dialysis machine in between matches. He returned to the U.S. to receive a kidney transplant from his brother. On July 27, 1982, Banks had a heart attack as he was on the operation table. He was 26 years old. That summer, a memorial show was held in Banks' hometown to raise money for his family. Wrestlers from five states appeared at the event, including, most notably, Tom Lynch, Brady Howard, Larry Winters, Marcial Bovee, the North American Madman, Ed Bonzo, Malcolm Monroe and Zoltan the Great.

Championships and accomplishments
Professional Promotions
Professional Promotions Central Championship (1 time)
Ohio Championship Wrestling
OCW Tag Team Championship (1 time) – with B.B. Coleman
Stampede Wrestling
Stampede North American Heavyweight Championship (1 time)
Stampede Wrestling International Tag Team Championship (2 times) – with Dynamite Kid and Mr. Sakurada

References

External links

1956 births
1982 deaths
20th-century professional wrestlers
American male professional wrestlers
Professional wrestlers from Ohio
Sportspeople from Akron, Ohio